Let's Keep It That Way is the 12th studio album by Anne Murray, released in February 1978. On the Canadian charts the album topped both the country and pop album charts. In the U.S., the album returned Murray to the top ten on the country album chart, a height she had not reached since 1974's Highly Prized Possession; on the pop album chart, the album reached No. 12 (and would ultimately be the highest-charting album of Murray's career on that chart).

Two singles were released from the album: first, a cover of the Everly Brothers' hit "Walk Right Back", which reached No. 4 on the U.S. country singles charts. The second single released, "You Needed Me", would ultimately become one of the biggest hits of Murray's career, topping all three Canadian charts; in the U.S. it reached No. 1 on the U.S. pop singles charts (becoming Murray's sole chart-topper on the Hot 100 charts), as well as No. 4 on the country singles charts, and No. 3 on the A/C charts. This track was also included in the UK issue of her next album, New Kind of Feeling. In addition to the two singles, the title track received substantial Adult Contemporary airplay as an album cut.

"You Needed Me" won Anne the Grammy Award for Best Female Pop Vocal Performance.

In 1979, Juice Newton released her version of the title song "Let's Keep It That Way" as a single. It became her first Top 40 hit, reaching No. 37 on the Billboard Hot Country Singles chart.

Nancy Sinatra recorded a cover of "Let's Keep It That Way" that was released as a single by Elektra Records in 1980. It was later included on her 2009 digital-only collection, Cherry Smiles - The Rare Singles.

Mac Davis recorded "Let's Keep It That Way", taking his version to the top ten of the U.S. country singles chart in 1980.

The album's cover photo was taken by Murray's then husband, Bill Langstroth.

Track listing

Chart performance

Certifications

Personnel
Anne Murray - vocals
Pat Riccio, Jr, Doug Riley - keyboards
Barry Keane - drums, percussion
Tom Szczesniak - bass
Aidan Mason, Brian Russell, Bob Mann, John Leslie Hug - guitar
Jay Dee Maness, Bob Lucier, Pee Wee Charles - steel guitar, dobro
Bill Hughes, Bruce Murray, Deborah Schaal - backing vocals 
Doug Riley, Rick Wilkins - string and horn arrangements

References

1978 albums
Anne Murray albums
Capitol Records albums
Albums produced by Jim Ed Norman